Troy Buchanan High School (formerly Buchanan High School) is a public high school in Troy, Missouri, United States that is part of the Lincoln County School District.

History
After Buchanan College sold their property in Troy to the local school district in 1905, Buchanan High School was founded in fall 1914. A 1916 referendum proposed to build a gymnasium on to the existing school building. That location was used until 1956, when classes were moved to a new location.

In 1996, a new building was constructed at a cost of $13 million. Work on a ninth-grade center began in 2007.

Academics
Advanced Placement classes are offered as part of a Latin honors program.

Athletics
TBHS athletic teams are nicknamed the Trojans; they are members of the Gateway Athletic Conference and compete in the South Division. A new athletic compound was opened in fall 2000. The softball team won state championships in 2011 and 2016.

Activities
The school has a strong National FFA Organization program.
For example it was named the Model of Innovations for Student Development in 2015. And was the Premiere Chapter for Building Communities in 2019. Additionally, In 2020 the Chapter was a National Finalist for the Model of Excellence Award. The Troy FFA has also found success in CDE/LDEs (Career/Leadership Development Events). Most recently the Troy FFA won 3rd Place in the Nation at the 2022 National FFA Parliamentary Procedure Competition held in conjunction with the 95th Annual National FFA Convention and Expo.

TBHS has two competitive show choirs, "Express" and "Soundwave". The program hosts an annual competition. Express has won national-level competitions before, and Soundwave swept the jayvee division in their 2019 season.

Notable alumni
Emily Crane, softball player
David Hungate, musician
DeAnna Price, track and field athlete
Ed Schieffer, legislator

References

External links

1914 establishments in Missouri
Educational institutions established in 1914
Public high schools in Missouri
Schools in Lincoln County, Missouri